The Argyle Case may refer to:

 The Argyle Case (1929 film), a murder horror film
 The Argyle Case (1917 film), a lost American silent film